The Silence are a religious order in the British science fiction television programme Doctor Who, represented by humanoids with alien-like physical characteristics. Executive producer Steven Moffat created the Silence, intending them to be scarier than past villains in Doctor Who. Though the phrase "Silence will fall" recurred throughout the 2010 series of Doctor Who, the Silence were not seen until the 2011 series' opener "The Impossible Astronaut". Their origins are eventually revealed in the 2013 special "The Time of the Doctor".

In creating the Silence shown in "The Impossible Astronaut", Moffat drew inspiration from Edvard Munch's 1893 expressionist painting The Scream as well as the Men in Black. The Silence continues Moffat's trend of using simple psychological concepts to make his monsters more frightening. In this case of the Silence, their existence is a secret because anyone who sees them immediately forgets about them after looking away, but retains suggestions made to them by the Silence. This allows them to have a pervasive influence across human history while being difficult to locate or resist.

Creation

Producer Steven Moffat created the Silence. Actor Matt Smith, who portrays the Eleventh Doctor, called these aliens "the scariest monsters in the Show's history" and Karen Gillan, who portrays the Doctor's companion Amy Pond, commented that the Silence could "rival the Weeping Angels in terms of scariness".

The Silence shown in "The Impossible Astronaut" are depicted as tall humanoids with bulbous heads and mouthless, bony faces, partly inspired by Edvard Munch's The Scream. Their eyes are sunken within their sockets and the skin of their cheeks stretches to the point of their narrow chins. Their large, shrivelled hands resemble a human hand except where the ring and middle fingers would be is a large flipper-like finger. They speak in low, guttural voices though they have no apparent mouths. Aliens affiliated with The Silence seen to date in the series have been dressed in black business suits with an unusual texture. They are partly inspired by mythological figures known as "men in black" that became popular amongst UFO conspiracy theorists during the 1950s and 60s, as well as grey aliens. The four-fingered hands of the Silence, with one finger much longer than the other, were inspired by the aye-aye lemur.

Reviewers have noted that, in creating the Silence seen in "The Impossible Astronaut", Moffat again uses a psychological gimmick. The Silence are perceived only while being viewed; they are instantly forgotten once a viewer looks away. To keep track of their encounters with the Silence, Doctor Whos characters mark tallies on their bodies or use audio-recorder devices embedded in their hands to let them know if they have seen the Silence. Silence are portrayed as being able to gather electrical energy around them and shoot it from their hands. These Silence use the energy discharge from their hands to displace someone, leaving behind only debris in the form of ash like flakes. While absorbing and discharging this energy, a hole appears where one would expect a mouth to be. This power is enhanced and becomes more destructive if they combine their energy and use it together. The Doctor believed they had humanity go to the moon simply to create a spacesuit for their needs.

Appearances
The unexplained ominous phrase "Silence will fall" recurs throughout the fifth series of Doctor Who, in 2010. The plot thread is left open in the series finale, "The Big Bang", where the force responsible for the TARDIS' destruction is left unidentified.

The Silence are then introduced—as a species rather than an event—in the sixth series' two-part premiere "The Impossible Astronaut"/"Day of the Moon"; one Silent observes the death of a future Doctor (Matt Smith) in Utah. Soon after, and unaware that companions River Song (Alex Kingston), Amy (Karen Gillan), and Rory (Arthur Darvill) met his future self and witnessed his death, the Doctor takes them to 1969, where they confront the Silence as they manipulate the US government. By recording a Silent saying "you should kill us all on sight" on a videophone—which the Doctor broadcasts during the Apollo 11 moonlanding—Earth's populace is conditioned to kill all Silence, though they will not remember doing so. In the process, the Doctor's group meets a mysterious girl in the same astronaut suit as the assailant who kills his future self.

Later in the series, this girl is revealed to be Amy and Rory's daughter, Melody Pond, who is also a young River Song. She is kidnapped as a baby, in "A Good Man Goes to War", by Madame Kovarian (Frances Barber) in order to become a weapon against the Doctor—her Time Lord-like genetic traits make her an ideal candidate to kill the Doctor. "Let's Kill Hitler" establishes that the Silence, and its Academy of the Question, has brainwashed her to such an end, though River goes against her programming and saves the Doctor's life. After biding their time until the conditions were right, Kovarian and the Silence kidnap River in "Closing Time", and force her to enact her role in the Doctor's death at Lake Silencio as seen in "The Impossible Astronaut". In "The Wedding of River Song", many Silence appear in a parallel universe caused by River not shooting the Doctor. The eyepatches worn by Madame Kovarian and others are revealed to be "Eye Drives"—external memory units—permitting associates of the Silence to perceive and remember the species. The Silence reveal, however, that they have the power to remotely kill the devices' wearers—as such, they betray Kovarian by killing her.

The Silence is revealed to be a religious movement composed of the species of the same name. The religion takes its name from the prophecy that when the oldest question in the universe is asked, silence will (or must) fall. As the Doctor is predestined to answer the question (which turns out to be the show's name itself, "Doctor who?"), the Silence made it their goal to make his death a fixed point in time and prevent this. Though the Doctor's death at Lake Silencio was thought to be a "fixed point" of history, it turns out he faked his death, with River imprisoned for it so that the Silence will believe him dead.

The Silence's origins are revealed in "The Time of the Doctor" (2013). They are genetically modified priests belonging to the Church of the Papal Mainframe; penitents would confess their sins and then forget their confessions immediately after giving them. During the hundreds of years of stalemate above the planet Trenzalore, where the Doctor refused to give his name lest he unleash the full horrors of a renewed Time War on the universe, the Papal Mainframe became known as the Church of the Silence, making the Doctor's continued silence its primary mission. During this period, the "Kovarian Chapter" of the Church is said to have split off and attempted to destroy the Doctor before he arrived on Trenzalore, as seen in Series 6. Their first attempt to stop the Doctor's arrival there is revealed to be the destruction of his TARDIS in Series 5. This action leads to the appearance of the cracks in the universe which brought the Church to Trenzalore in the first place. When the stalemate ends and Trenzalore is plunged into battle, the remaining Silence (who are loyal to the Papal Mainframe) fight alongside the Doctor to protect the planet's inhabitants from invading enemies, as noted by Tasha Lem. Together, the Doctor and the Silence defend the planet until everyone but the Daleks have retreated or burned.

Summary of appearances
Doctor Who
"The Impossible Astronaut" / "Day of the Moon" (2011)
"The Wedding of River Song" (2011)
"The Time of the Doctor" (2013)

Cameos
"Closing Time" (2011)
"Revolution of the Daleks" (2021)

Other
"The Gunpowder Plot" (2011)

Reception
The Guardians Dan Martin responded favourably to the Silence. Though he described them as "a standard Moffat psychological trick", he commended it as the "most refined to date" and praised an introductory scene that was reminiscent of the unsettling directorial work of David Lynch. Alan Sepinwall of HitFix wrote that though the Silence's central gimmick felt similar to previous ones, Moffat "continues to use those same tricks in such clever combinations, and with such technical flair, that I'm not tired of most of them yet."

The A.V. Clubs Keith Phipps wrote favourably of Moffat's handling of the species in "Day of the Moon". In particular, the introduction of a hand audio-recorder concept as particularly clever, as it allowed for developments in Rory's paranoia concerning Amy's feelings for the Doctor, although Phipps reflected that he was confused by the montage that connected the Silence to other mentions of "silence" in previous episodes.

Following concerns being raised about whether the Silence had made Doctor Who too scary for children, Moffat responded by saying, "I emphatically think that's not the case ... children like to be scared—like on a ghost train or a rollercoaster."

Some reviewers noted favourable comparisons with monsters from American fantasy series Buffy the Vampire Slayer, The Gentlemen from its critically acclaimed fourth season episode "Hush" (1999). Mike Moody for AOL TV wrote of the Silence, "They're pretty damn scary, and they remind me of The Gentleman from Buffy. (Anything that recalls Buffy is a plus for me.)" A Television Without Pity reviewer described the Silence as monsters which "look essentially identical to the Gentlemen from Buffy".

References

External links

The Silence on BBC America's website

Doctor Who races
Fictional religions
Fictional priests and priestesses